Stenalia ascaniaenovae is a beetle in the genus Stenalia of the family Mordellidae. It was described in 1974.

References

ascaniaenovae
Beetles described in 1957